In the United States, road signs are, for the most part, standardized by federal regulations, most notably in the Manual on Uniform Traffic Control Devices (MUTCD) and its companion volume the Standard Highway Signs (SHS).

There are no plans for adopting the Vienna Convention on Road Signs and Signals standards. The 1971 MUTCD adopted several Vienna Convention-inspired symbol signs with the intent to transition to symbols in lieu of words as "rapidly as possible", but U.S. drivers were baffled by symbol signs.  The language about "rapidly" transitioning to symbols was removed in the 1978 MUTCD.  The result was to effectively freeze several measures intended to be temporary until U.S. drivers could learn the relevant symbols' meanings. For example, the "Do Not Enter" word message is not found on the Vienna Convention's equivalent sign. Two symbol signs were eliminated, respectively, in the 2000 and 2003 MUTCDs (thereby requiring use of the previous word message signs): Pavement Ends and Narrow Bridge.

Eighteen states use the manual without alterations; 22 states, the District of Columbia, and Puerto Rico have adopted it in conjunction with a supplemental volume; and ten states have a state version in substantial conformance to the MUTCD. There are localized versions used in large cities such as New York City which use a naming system compatible with the MUTCD and/or state supplement. The MUTCD and SHS establish seven categories of signs for road and highway use, as follows (all signs from national MUTCD, unless noted):

Regulatory signs 
Regulatory signs give instructions to motorists, pedestrians, and cyclists. Signs including Stop, Yield, No Turns, No Trucks, No Parking, No Stopping, Minimum Speed, Right Turn Only, Do Not Enter, Weight Limit, and Speed Limit are considered regulatory signs. Some have special shapes, such as the octagon for the Stop sign and the crossbuck for railroad crossings. Some signs can be localized, such as No Parking, and some are found only in state and local jurisdictions, as they are based on state or local laws, such as New York City's "Don't Block the Box" signs. These signs are in the R series of signs in the MUTCD and typically in the R series in most state supplements or state MUTCDs.

R1 series: Stop and yield 
The MUTCD's R1 series is for Stop and Yield. As not all situations are covered, several states have their own standards in addition to the MUTCD. The 4-WAY and 3-WAY plaques (R1-3) were deprecated in the 2009 Edition of the MUTCD in favor of the ALL WAY plaque (R1-3P).

R2 series: Speed limit 
The MUTCD's R2 series is for speed limit signs. Some state supplements and state MUTCDs place various speed limit signs in other series. As all situations are not covered, several states have their own standards in addition to the MUTCD. Speed limits in the United States are always in miles per hour. Metric speed limit signs in kilometers per hour are authorized but extremely rare, usually seen near the borders with Canada and Mexico, both of which use the metric system. Many states, however, disallow the use of metric signs on state-maintained roads due to MUTCD restrictions, increasing the rarity of such signs.

R3 series: Lane usage and turns 
The MUTCD's R3 series of signs is for lane usage and turn signs. As all situations are not covered, several states have their own standards in addition to the MUTCD.

R4 series: Regulation of movement 
The MUTCD's R4 series of signs is for the regulation of movement signs. As all situations are not covered, several states have their own standards in addition to the MUTCD.

R5 series: Exclusionary 
The MUTCD's R5 series of signs is for exclusionary signs. As all situations are not covered, several states have their own standards in addition to the MUTCD. The most common of these signs is the do not enter sign.

R6 series: One way and divided highway 
The MUTCD's R6 series of signs is for one way and divided highway signs. As all situations are not covered, several states have their own standards in addition to the MUTCD. The most common of these signs is the One Way sign.

R7 series: Parking 
The MUTCD allows for three types of parking signs: permissive, No Parking, and No Standing. However, in most states, there is an additional more restrictive one, No Stopping. These signs are found in the R7 series of signs in the MUTCD. As all situations are not covered, several states and local governments have their own standards in addition to the MUTCD.  Permissive parking signs allow for parking for either an unlimited or varied amount of time. They are often used in conjunction with parking meters and parking permits. They are specified by the MUTCD to be green on white. Local variations occur with additional information and slightly different designs.  No Parking signs indicate that loading or unloading while temporarily stopped is permitted, but the driver must not leave the vicinity of the vehicle. Some No Parking signs display time restrictions, while others are permanent restrictions. There are also temporary versions of the signs, often of similar design to the permanent ones. These signs are specified by the MUTCD to be red on white, although local variations occur.  No Standing signs indicate that stopping temporarily to load or unload passengers is allowed, but vehicles cannot be stopped at the location for longer periods of time, even if the driver remains with the vehicle. As with no parking signs, some restrictions displayed on the signs are permanent and some are time based.

R8 series: Parking and emergency restrictions 
The MUTCD's R8 series of signs is for parking restriction and emergency restriction signs. As all situations are not covered, several states have their own standards in addition to the MUTCD.

R9 series: Bicycles and pedestrians 
The MUTCD's R9 series of signs is for bicycle and pedestrian signs. As all situations are not covered, several states have their own standards in addition to the MUTCD.

R10 series: Traffic signal 
The MUTCD's R10 series of signs is for traffic signal related signs. As all situations are not covered, several states have their own standards in addition to the MUTCD.

R11 series: Road closed 
The MUTCD's R11 series of signs is for road closure-related signs. As all situations are not covered, several states have their own standards in addition to the MUTCD.

R12 series: Weight limits 
The MUTCD's R12 series of signs is for weight limit-related signs. As all situations are not covered, several states have their own standards in addition to the MUTCD.

R13 series: Weigh stations 
The MUTCD's R13 series of signs is for weigh station related signs. As all situations are not covered, several states have their own standards in addition to the MUTCD.

R14 series: Truck routes 
The MUTCD's R14 series of signs is for truck route-related signs. As all situations are not covered, several states have their own standards in addition to the MUTCD.

R15 series: Rail and light rail 
The MUTCD's R15 series of signs is for rail- and light rail-related signs. As all situations are not covered, several states have their own standards in addition to the MUTCD.

R16 series: Seat belts and headlight use 
The MUTCD's R16 series of signs is for seat belt and headlight use-related signs. As all situations are not covered, several states have their own standards in addition to the MUTCD.

Warning signs 
Warning signs are found in the W series of the national MUTCD. They highlight existing conditions, such as a curve, school, dead end street, or traffic signal. They can also warn of possible danger such as bumps, bicycles, low flying aircraft, or emergency vehicles. They are either yellow or fluorescent yellow in color and, with a few exceptions, are usually diamond-shaped and sometimes have square or rectangular smaller signs or plaques associated with them. Most W series signs can also be found with orange backgrounds for temporary use in situations such as construction zones. Some of the temporary-use signs are for use only in temporary situations.

W1 series: Horizontal alignment 
The MUTCD's W1 series of signs is for warning signs relating to horizontal alignment As not all situations are covered, several states have their own standards in addition to the MUTCD.

W2 series: Junctions 
The MUTCD's W2 series of signs is for warning signs relating to junctions. As not all situations are covered, several states have their own standards in addition to the MUTCD.

W3 series: Advance traffic control 
The MUTCD's W3 series of signs is for warning signs relating to advance traffic controls. As all situations are not covered, several states have their own standards in addition to the MUTCD. The MUTCD provides options for graphic and text signs.

W4 series: Lanes and merges 
The MUTCD's W4 series of signs is for warning signs relating to lane merges and added lanes, as well as lane endings. As all situations are not covered, several states have their own standards in addition to the MUTCD.

W5 series: Road width restrictions 
The MUTCD's W5 series of signs is for warning signs relating to road width restrictions. As all situations are not covered, several states have their own standards in addition to the MUTCD. The MUTCD provides options for graphic and text signs.

W6 series: Divided highway 
The MUTCD's W6 series of signs is for warning signs relating to divided highways. As all situations are not covered, several states have their own standards in addition to the MUTCD. The MUTCD provides options for graphic and text signs.

W7 series: Hills 
The MUTCD's W7 series of signs is for warning signs relating to hills. As all situations are not covered, several states have their own standards in addition to the MUTCD.

W8 series: Pavement and roadway conditions 
The MUTCD's W8 series of signs is for warning signs relating to pavement and roadway conditions. As all situations are not covered, several states have their own standards in addition to the MUTCD.

W9 series: Lane transitions 
The MUTCD's W9 series of signs is for warning signs relating to lane transitions. As all situations are not covered, several states have their own standards in addition to the MUTCD.

W10 series: Crossings 
The MUTCD's W10 series of signs is for warning signs relating to crossings. As all situations are not covered, several states have their own standards in addition to the MUTCD.

W11 series: Advance warnings 
The MUTCD's W11 series of signs is for warning signs relating to advance warnings. As all situations are not covered, several states have their own standards in addition to the MUTCD. The MUTCD allows use of a fluorescent yellow-green background color for signs relating to non-motorized vehicles crossing the road.

W12 series: Obstacles 
The MUTCD's W12 series of signs is for warning signs relating to obstacles. As all situations are not covered, several states have their own standards in addition to the MUTCD. Metric low bridge signs in meters are authorized but extremely rare, usually seen near the borders with Canada and Mexico, both of which use the metric system. Many states, however, disallow the use of metric signs on state-maintained roads due to system restrictions, increasing the rarity of such signs.

W13 series: Advisory speeds 
The MUTCD's W13 series of signs is for warning signs relating to advisory speeds. As all situations are not covered, several states have their own standards in addition to the MUTCD. Speed limits in the United States are always in miles per hour. Metric advisory speed signs in kilometers per hour are authorized but extremely rare, usually seen near the borders with Canada and Mexico, both of which use the metric system. Many states, however, disallow the use of metric signs on state-maintained roads due to system restrictions, increasing the rarity of such signs.

W14 series: Dead end streets and no passing zones 
The MUTCD's W14 series of signs is for warning signs relating to dead-end streets and no-passing zones. As all situations are not covered, several states and local governments have additional signs for other types of situations not covered by the MUTCD.

W15 series: Playgrounds 
The MUTCD's W15 series of signs is for warning signs relating to playgrounds. As all situations are not covered, several states have their own standards in addition to the MUTCD.

W16 series: Supplemental plaques 
The MUTCD's W16 series of signs is for supplemental plaques for warning signs. As all situations are not covered, several states have their own standards in addition to the MUTCD.

W17 series: Speed humps 
The MUTCD's W17 series of signs is for warnings relating to speed humps. As all situations are not covered, several states have their own standards in addition to the MUTCD.

W18 series: No traffic signs 
The MUTCD's W18 series of signs is for warnings relating to no further traffic signs. As all situations are not covered, several states have their own standards in addition to the MUTCD.

W19 series: Freeway or expressway end signs 
The MUTCD's W19 series of signs is for warning signs relating to the end of a freeway or expressway. As all situations are not covered, several states have their own standards in addition to the MUTCD.

W20 series: Work zones 
The MUTCD's W20 series of signs is for warning signs relating to work zones. These signs are typically orange background ones used for temporary situations. As all situations are not covered, several states have their own standards in addition to the MUTCD.

W21 series: Road work 
The MUTCD's W21 series of signs is for warning signs relating to road work. They typically have orange backgrounds and are used for temporary situations. As all situations are not covered, several states have their own standards in addition to the MUTCD

W22 series: Blasting zones 
The MUTCD's W22 series of signs is for warning signs relating to blasting zones. They typically have orange backgrounds and are used for temporary situations. As all situations are not covered, several states have their own standards in addition to the MUTCD.

W23 series: Slow traffic 
The MUTCD's W23 series of signs is for warning signs relating to slow traffic. They typically have orange backgrounds and are used for temporary situations. As all situations are not covered, several states have their own standards in addition to the MUTCD.

W24 series: Lane shifts 
The MUTCD's W24 series of signs is for warning signs relating to lane shifts, where traffic is diverted slightly toward the left or right of the roadway, but the route is otherwise unchanged. These signs typically have orange background and are used for temporary situations. As all situations are not covered, several states have their own standards in addition to the MUTCD.

W25 series: Oncoming traffic has extended green 
The MUTCD's W25 series of signs is for signs warning that oncoming traffic has an extended green signal at a traffic light. As all situations are not covered, several states have their own standards in addition to the MUTCD.

Guide signs 
Guide signs include highway route markers (shields), which are reassurance markers, interchange signs, including advance guide and exit signs, and mile markers. Advance guide and exit signs usually feature control cities or other locations to help direct drivers toward their destinations. The position of the exit number plaque indicates right or left exit (and should indicate center lane exit).

Interchange signs

Toll signs 
Chapter 2F of the MUTCD deals with signs relating to tolls.

Motorist services

General information

School zone signs 
The S series of signs is specially designated by the MUTCD for use around schools. Some states have additional school warning-related signs in the S series, the W series of warning signs, and/or the R series of regulatory signs of the state supplement or state MUTCD. As of 2009 the MUTCD requires school warning signs to have fluorescent yellow-green backgrounds.

See also 
 Comparison of traffic signs in English-speaking countries
 Glossary of road transport terms
 Road signs in Canada
 Street signs in Chicago – Street name signs
 Street signs in New York City – Street name signs
 Warning sign

Notes

References

External links